Retail Food Group (Australia) Limited, often abbreviated as RFG, is an ASX listed company and Australian franchisor based in Robina, Queensland. It owns numerous companies including Gloria Jean's Coffees, Brumby's Bakeries, Donut King, Michel's Patisserie, Di Bella Coffee, The Coffee Guy, Café2U, Pizza Capers and Crust Pizza.

Founding
Established in 1989, RFG was incorporated in 2003 to act as a holding company for several fast-growing brand systems. The company roasts and supplies coffee to its network.

Portfolio of companies
Brumby's Bakeries is a chain of Australian and New Zealand retail bakeries that was established in Ashburton, Victoria in 1975.
Crust Pizza
Donut King is a franchise system which was founded in 1981 in Sydney and specialises in donuts and coffee. 
Gloria Jean's Coffees is a franchised coffeehouse company that has opened more than 1,000 coffee houses across 39 markets worldwide, including over 460 stores in Australia.
Michel's Patisserie specialises in retail bakery-style food and is the largest pastry chain in Australia. 
Pizza Capers has over 110 stores throughout Australia.
Cafe2U and The Coffee Guy are brand systems that operate under mobile coffee van models.
Di Bella

Controversy
A 2017 investigation by Sydney Morning Herald noted that hundreds of franchisees were left financially devastated after investing in the brands under the RFG umbrella.

See also
 List of pizzerias in Australia
 List of restaurant chains in Australia

References

External links
 

1989 establishments in Australia
Restaurants established in 1989
Food and drink companies of Australia
Companies based on the Gold Coast, Queensland
Holding companies of Australia
Fast-food franchises
Pizzerias in Australia
Companies based in Queensland
Pizza chains of Australia
Companies listed on the Australian Securities Exchange
Fast-food chains of Australia